The Big Four Institutes of Technology are four institutes of technology after the national adjustment of colleges in 1950s.

List of 4 Institutes

References 

Higher education in China
Universities and colleges in China